Eastern Asian Men's Volleyball Championship is a men's international volleyball competition in East Asia for member nations of the Eastern Asia Zonal Volleyball Association (EAZVA). The first competition was contested in 1998 in Macau and tournaments have been played every two years since then. The current champion is Japan, which won its six title at the 2017 tournament.

The 2019 Eastern Asian Championship took place in Zhangjiagang, China.

Results summary

Teams reaching the top four

Medal summary

Participating nations

Awards

Most Valuable Player

Best Coach

References

External links
 Official AVC website

East Asia Volleyball Championship
Recurring sporting events established in 1998
Volleyball competitions in Asia